Rajiv Parakh is the chairman  at the Division of Peripheral Vascular and Endovascular Sciences at Medanta, Gurgaon, India. 
In 1986 he completed his vascular surgery training and acquired a fellowship from the Royal College of Surgeons in the United Kingdom. He returned to India where, in 1990, he established one of the country's first independent departments
 of vascular surgery at a city hospital.

In 2007, Parakh became the secretary of the International Society for Vascular Surgery  in New York City.

Parakh's vascular team handles at  Medanta cases of leg ulcers, leg attacks, stroke, gangrene and limb threatening trauma.

Expertise in

 Peripheral Vascular & Endovascular surgery
 Carotid Surgery
 Endovascular Interventions
 Endovascular aneurysm repair
 Below the knee angioplasty
 Vascular Trauma

Memberships & certifications

 Elected Vice President of International Society for Vascular Surgery (USA), 2010
 Elected Secretary of International Society for Vascular Surgery (ISVS), USA- 2007
 Founder & Life Member of Vascular Society of India (VSI) 1997
 Founder & Executive Committee Member of Endovascular Intervention Society of India (EISI)
 Member of the European Society of Vascular Surgery (ESVS))
 National Convener for the Fellowship programme in Vascular Surgery of the National Board of Examiners, New Delhi – now upgraded to Diploma in Peripheral Vascular & Endovascular surgery

Awards

 Vice President of International Society for Vascular Surgeon (U.S.A)
 Prof. Hari Vaishnava Oration
 Organizing Chairman 13th Annual Conference of Vascular  Society of India attended by the President and Treasurer of the Vascular Society of Great Britain and the Editor of the European Journal of Vascular Surgery  
 Sushil Malik Oration

Publications
 International, multicentre, randomized, double blind study to compare the overall mortality in acutely ill medical patients treated with enoxaprin versus placebo in addition to graduated elastic stockings
 Assessment of Total thrombus load estimation in symptomatic patients with venous thromboembolism
  Takayasu's arteritis: An Indian Perspective
 Pulmonary embolism: A frequent Occurrence in Indian Patients with Symptomatic Lower Limb Venous Thrombosis
 Snapshots in Surgery : Pulsatile Scrotum
 Prevention and treatment of venous thromboembolism. International Consensus Statement (Guidelines according to scientific evidence).
 Cervical Asymmetry: Medical Images.
 Asymptomatic Coronary Artery disease in patients with symptomatic peripheral vascular disease - detected by dobutamine stress echo and coronary angiography.
 Studies on homocysteine demonstrating its significance as a possible tool for differential diagnosis in occlusive vascular disease
 Limb Salvage angioplasty in vascular surgery practice

See also
 Medanta
 Vascular surgery

References

Indian surgeons
Year of birth missing (living people)
Living people
Medical doctors from Haryana